Cyanocobalamin is a form of vitamin  used to treat vitamin  deficiency except in the presence of cyanide toxicity. The deficiency may occur in pernicious anemia, following surgical removal of the stomach, with fish tapeworm, or due to bowel cancer. It is less preferred than hydroxocobalamin for treating vitamin  deficiency. It is used by mouth, by injection into a muscle, or as a nasal spray.

Cyanocobalamin is generally well tolerated. Minor side effects may include diarrhea and itchiness. Serious side effects may include anaphylaxis, low blood potassium, and heart failure. Use is not recommended in those who are allergic to cobalt or have Leber's disease. Vitamin  is an essential nutrient meaning that it cannot be made by the body but is required for life.

Cyanocobalamin was first manufactured in the 1940s. It is available as a generic medication and over the counter. In 2020, it was the 105th most commonly prescribed medication in the United States, with more than 6million prescriptions.

Medical use
Cyanocobalamin is usually prescribed after surgical removal of part or all of the stomach or intestine to ensure adequate serum levels of vitamin . It is also used to treat pernicious anemia, vitamin  deficiency (due to low intake from food or inability to absorb due to genetic or other factors), thyrotoxicosis, hemorrhage, malignancy, liver disease and kidney disease. Cyanocobalamin is also used to perform the Schilling test to check ability to absorb vitamin .

Cyanocobalamin is also produced in the body (and then excreted via urine) after intravenous hydroxycobalamin is used to treat cyanide poisoning.

Side effects
Possible side effects of cyanocobalamin injection include allergic reactions such as hives, difficult breathing; redness of the face; swelling of the arms, hands, feet, ankles or lower legs; extreme thirst; and diarrhea. Less-serious side effects may include headache, dizziness, leg pain, itching, or rash.

Treatment of megaloblastic anemia with concurrent vitamin  deficiency using  vitamers (including cyanocobalamin), creates the possibility of hypokalemia due to increased erythropoiesis (red blood cell production) and consequent cellular uptake of potassium upon anemia resolution. When treated with cyanocobalamin, patients with Leber's disease may develop serious optic atrophy, possibly leading to blindness.

Chemistry
Vitamin  is the "generic descriptor" name for any vitamers of vitamin . Animals, including humans, can convert cyanocobalamin to any one of the active vitamin  compounds.

Cyanocobalamin is one of the most widely manufactured vitamers in the vitamin  family (the family of chemicals that function as  when put into the body), because cyanocobalamin is the most air-stable of the  forms. It is the easiest to crystallize and therefore easiest to purify after it is produced by bacterial fermentation. It can be obtained as dark red crystals or as an amorphous red powder. Cyanocobalamin is hygroscopic in the anhydrous form, and sparingly soluble in water (1:80). The vitamin  coenzymes are unstable in light. After consumption the cyanide ligand is replaced by other groups (adenosyl, methyl) to produce the biologically active forms. The cyanide is converted to thiocyanate and excreted by the kidney.

Chemical reactions

In the cobalamins, cobalt normally exists in the trivalent state, Co(III).

 and  can be prepared from cyanocobalamin by controlled potential reduction, or chemical reduction using sodium borohydride in alkaline solution, zinc in acetic acid, or by the action of thiols.

 is one of the most nucleophilic species known in aqueous solution. This property allows the convenient preparation of cobalamin analogs with different substituents, via nucleophilic attack on alkyl halides and vinyl halides.

Steric hindrance is the major limiting factor in the synthesis of the  coenzyme analogs. This effect may be due to the strong coordination between benzimidazole and the central cobalt atom, pulling it down into the plane of the corrin ring. The trans effect determines the polarizability of the Co–C bond so formed. Various secondary alkyl halides are then readily attacked by the modified  to give the corresponding stable cobalamin analogs. The products are usually extracted and purified by phenol-methylene chloride extraction or by column chromatography.

Cobalamin analogs prepared by this method include the naturally occurring coenzymes methylcobalamin and cobamamide, and other cobalamins that do not occur naturally, such as vinylcobalamin, carboxymethylcobalamin and cyclohexylcobalamin. This reaction is under review for use as a catalyst for chemical dehalogenation, organic reagent and photosensitized catalyst systems.

Production
Cyanocobalamin is commercially prepared by bacterial fermentation. Fermentation by a variety of microorganisms yields a mixture of methylcobalamin, hydroxocobalamin and adenosylcobalamin. These compounds are converted to cyanocobalamin by addition of potassium cyanide in the presence of sodium nitrite and heat. Since multiple species of Propionibacterium produce no exotoxins or endotoxins and have been granted GRAS status (generally regarded as safe) by the United States Food and Drug Administration, they are the preferred bacterial fermentation organisms for vitamin  production.

Historically, the physiological form was initially thought to be cyanocobalamin. This was because hydroxocobalamin produced by bacteria was changed to cyanocobalamin during purification in activated charcoal columns after separation from the bacterial cultures (because cyanide is naturally present in activated charcoal). Cyanocobalamin is the form in most pharmaceutical preparations because adding cyanide stabilizes the molecule.

The total world production of vitamin B12, by four companies (the French Sanofi-Aventis and three Chinese companies) in 2008 was 35 tonnes.

Metabolism 
The two bioactive forms of vitamin  are methylcobalamin in cytosol and adenosylcobalamin in mitochondria. Multivitamins often contain cyanocobalamin, which is presumably converted to bioactive forms in the body. Both methylcobalamin and adenosylcobalamin are commercially available as supplement pills. The MMACHC gene product catalyzes the decyanation of cyanocobalamin as well as the dealkylation of alkylcobalamins including methylcobalamin and adenosylcobalamin. This function has also been attributed to cobalamin reductases. The MMACHC gene product and cobalamin reductases enable the interconversion of cyano- and alkylcobalamins.

Cyanocobalamin is added to fortify nutrition, including baby milk powder, breakfast cereals and energy drinks for humans, also animal feed for poultry, swine and fish. Vitamin  becomes inactive due to hydrogen cyanide and nitric oxide in cigarette smoke. Vitamin  also becomes inactive due to nitrous oxide  commonly known as laughing gas, used for anaesthesia and as a recreational drug. Vitamin  becomes inactive due to microwaving or other forms of heating.

In the cytosol 
Methylcobalamin and 5-methyltetrahydrofolate are needed by methionine synthase in the methionine cycle to transfer a methyl group from 5-methyltetrahydrofolate to homocysteine, thereby generating tetrahydrofolate (THF) and methionine, which is used to make SAMe. SAMe is the universal methyl donor and is used for DNA methylation and to make phospholipid membranes, choline, sphingomyelin, acetylcholine, and other neurotransmitters.

In mitochondria 

The enzymes that use  as a built-in cofactor are methylmalonyl-CoA mutase (PDB 4REQ) and methionine synthase (PDB 1Q8J).

The metabolism of propionyl-CoA occurs in the mitochondria and requires Vitamin  (as adenosylcobalamin) to make succinyl-CoA. When the conversion of propionyl-CoA to succinyl-CoA in the mitochondria fails due to Vitamin  deficiency, elevated blood levels of methylmalonic acid (MMA) occur. Thus, elevated blood levels of homocysteine and MMA may both be indicators of vitamin  deficiency.

Adenosylcobalamin is needed as cofactor in methylmalonyl-CoA mutase—MUT enzyme. Processing of cholesterol and protein gives propionyl-CoA that is converted to methylmalonyl-CoA, which is used by MUT enzyme to make succinyl-CoA. Vitamin  is needed to prevent anemia, since making porphyrin and heme in mitochondria for producing hemoglobin in red blood cells depends on succinyl-CoA made by vitamin .

Absorption and transport 
Inadequate absorption of vitamin  may be related to coeliac disease. Intestinal absorption of vitamin  requires successively three different protein molecules: haptocorrin, intrinsic factor and transcobalamin II.

See also 
 Methylcobalamin
 Hydroxocobalamin
 Adenosylcobalamin
 Cobalamin biosynthesis

References

External links 
 

B vitamins
Organocobalt compounds
Cofactors
Vitamin B12
Corrinoids
Wikipedia medicine articles ready to translate

pt:Cianocobalamina